James Joyce (1882–1941) was an Irish modernist avant-garde novelist and poet.

James Joyce may also refer to:
 James Parker Joyce (1835–1903), New Zealand politician from Southland
 James Joyce (congressman) (1870–1931), U.S. Representative from Ohio
 James Joyce (rugby union) (fl. 1903), Australian rugby union player
 James Joyce (athlete) (born 1936), Australian Olympic hurdler
 Jim Joyce (born 1955), Major League Baseball umpire
 LÉ James Joyce (P62), a ship of the Irish Naval Service
 James Joyce (biography), a 1959 biography by Richard Ellmann